The 1968 State of the Union Address was given by the 36th president of the United States, Lyndon B. Johnson, on Wednesday, January 17, 1968, to the 90th United States Congress.  He reported this, "And I report to you that I believe, with abiding conviction, that this people—nurtured by their deep faith, tutored by their hard lessons, moved by their high aspirations—have the will to meet the trials that these times impose."

See also
1968 United States presidential election

References

External links 
 1968 State of the Union Address (full video and audio at www.millercenter.org)

State of the Union addresses
Presidency of Lyndon B. Johnson
90th United States Congress
State of the Union Address
State of the Union Address
State of the Union Address
State of the Union Address
January 1968 events in the United States
Speeches by Lyndon B. Johnson